The Winfield House was a historic house at 853 Hancock Street in Quincy, Massachusetts.  Built c. 1880, it was a -story wood-frame structure with exuberant Queen Anne styling.  It was built by John Chamberlin, a traveling hardware salesman.  The house was particularly distinctive for its onion-domed tower near the center of the structure, an unusual placement and topping for such a tower.  It was listed on the National Register of Historic Places in 1989.

Winfield House served as a restaurant for 50 years. The house was demolished in 1998 by its then owners, Eastern Nazarene College, to make way for a campus expansion; all that is left now is stairs leading up to an empty house lot and the elm tree. The carriage house and a portion of the main house floating staircase were moved to a private residence in Stoughton, MA.

See also
National Register of Historic Places listings in Quincy, Massachusetts

References

Houses in Quincy, Massachusetts
Queen Anne architecture in Massachusetts
Houses completed in 1880
Demolished buildings and structures in Massachusetts
National Register of Historic Places in Quincy, Massachusetts
Houses on the National Register of Historic Places in Norfolk County, Massachusetts
Buildings and structures demolished in 1998